The Sowell Family Collection in Literature, Community, and the Natural World, housed in Texas Tech University's Southwest Collection/Special Collections Library in Lubbock, Texas, preserves the journals, drafts, correspondence, ephemera, born-digital and audio visual media of 28 American writers on the natural world. Selected portions of the collection may be viewed online and in person. According to a census of Collection finding aids available from the Texas Archival Resources Online, there are currently around 1340 linear feet of processed materials in the Collection, including ephemera documenting its own history.

History 
Texas Tech University's Sowell Family Collection in Literature, Community, and the Natural World began with discussions with Barry Lopez and other contributors in 1998. The first papers were acquired and processed in 2000, and as early as 2001 Texas Tech Libraries hosted a reading by a Sowell Collection author. The Collection has been open to researchers since at least 2007, and open to the public since 2012. The University hosts an annual conference for the Collection. Underwritten by former Texas Tech University Regent James Sowell, the Collection holds papers, manuscripts, photography, and art from 28 creators, and continues to acquire materials from new and existing writers. Acquisitions from the 2020s include the papers of Stephen Graham Jones, J. Drew Lanham, and Barbara Ras. The authors in the collection have received recognitions such as The National Book Award and include MacArthur and Stegner Fellows. Many of the Collection's early writers have ties to the Orion Society and attended Orion magazine's seminal Fire & Grit conference in June 1999. Additionally, the Collection's supporters, users, and contributors over the years have included members of the Association for the Study of Literature and the Environment and the Western Literature Association, among other organizations.

Collection writers 

 Rick Bass
 Lisa Couturier
 Max Crawford
 David James Duncan
 Gretel Ehrlich
 Paul Gruchow
 Paul Hawken
 Clyde Jones
 Stephen Graham Jones
 William Kittredge
 Michael Koepf
 John Lane
 J. Drew Lanham
 Barry Lopez
 Bill McKibben
 Susan Brind Morrow
 Gary Paul Nabhan
 Howard Norman
 Andrea Peacock
 Doug Peacock
 Robert Michael Pyle
 David Quammen
 Barbara Ras
 Marc Reisner
 Pattiann Rogers
 Sandra Scofield
 Annick Smith
 Ro Wauer

Supporting papers and collections 
These papers and collections housed at Texas Tech are also related to The Sowell Family Collection in Literature, Community, and the Natural World by affinity or history but not part of its core holdings:

 Susan Tomlinson Papers
 Edward Abbey Papers
 Edward Hoagland Papers
 The Richard Rowland Comanche Pots Collection
 The Orion Society Audio Visual Collection Papers
 The Stephen J. Small Conservation Collection

External links 

 The Sowell Collection landing page and overview at TTU Libraries
 Texas Archival Resources Online's Southwest Collection finding aids (includes the Sowell Collection)
 Sowell Collection blog published by TTU libraries

References 

Texas Tech University

Literary archives in the United States
Special collections libraries in the United States
Museums in Lubbock, Texas